Tadeusz Milewski (17 May 1906 – 5 March 1966) was a Polish linguist and Professor at the Jagiellonian University in Kraków, specializing in the study of the Slavic languages, general linguistics and linguistic typology.

Education and career

Tadeusz Milewski was born in Kolomyia and studied linguistics at the University of Lviv (1960–1967), under the supervision of Tadeusz Lehr-Spławiński, from 1925 to 1929. His dissertation research was on the Polabian language. Together with his professor, he moved to the Jagiellonian University in Kraków in 1929 and took up a teaching position there.

Like other professors of the Jagiellonian University, he was arrested by the Gestapo on 6 November 1939 (as part of the Sonderaktion Krakau), and he spent a year in concentration camps in Sachsenhausen and Dachau. After his release, he participated in clandestine teaching in German-occupied Poland, and also started working on his book “Outline of general linguistics”.

Milewski became a professor at the Jagiellonian University in 1946, and taught there in various roles until his death on 5 March 1966 in Kraków, after a long illness. The funeral was held by Archbishop Karol Wojtyła, a former student and longtime friend.

Scientific contributions

Milewski is internationally best known for his contributions to linguistic typology, in particular his dictinction between concentric and excentric language types, which is widely recognized as a precursor to the well-known distinction between head-marking and dependent-marking languages. He is also the originator of Milewski's typology. In addition to his interests in Slavic and Indo-European linguistics, he had a strong interest in the languages of North America.

Selected works 

 Milewski, Tadeusz. 1936. L’Indo-hittite et l’indo-européen. Cracovie: Imprimerie de l’Université.
 Milewski, Tadeusz. 1950. La structure de la phrase dans les langues indigènes de l'Amérique du Nord. Lingua Posnaniensis 2. 162–207.
 Milewski, Tadeusz. 1951. The conception of the word in languages of North American natives. Lingua Posnaniensis 3. 248–268.
 Milewski, Tadeusz. 1962. Wstęp do jezykoznawstwa. Łódź: Panstwowe Wydawnictwo Naukowe.
 Milewski, Tadeusz. 1964. Typological similarities between Caucasian and American Indian languages. Actas y Memorias (XXXV Congreso Internacional de Americanistas, Mexico 1962), vol. 2, 533–539. México, D.F.: Instituto Nacional de Antropología e Historia.
 Milewski, Tadeusz. 1965. Językoznawsto. Warszawa: Państwowe Wydawnictwo Naukowe.
 Milewski, Tadeusz. 1967. Études typologiques sur les langues indigènes de l’Amérique/Typological studies on the American Indian languages (Prace Komisji Orientalistycznej, 7.). Kraków: Polska Akademia Nauk.
 Milewski, Tadeusz. 1970. Voraussetzungen einer typologischen Sprachwissenschaft. Linguistics 8(59). 62–107.
 Milewski, Tadeusz. 1973. Introduction to the study of language. The Hague: Mouton. (= English translation of Milewski 1965)

Notes

1906 births
Academic staff of Jagiellonian University
Linguists from Poland
1966 deaths